I Am Brazil is the third album from Dublin-based instrumental band The Redneck Manifesto. It was recorded in Black Box Studios, France.

Track listing

References

External links

2005 albums
The Redneck Manifesto (band) albums